The Hotcourses Group was the public name for Hotcourses Ltd, an educational guidance company based in Fulham and the world's largest course database.

In January 2017, Hotcourses Group was bought by IDP Education and was rebranded as IDP Connect in January 2019. IDP Education was founded in 1969 and in 1989 co-founded IELTS, an English testing system.

Background
The company, now known as IDP Connect, has offices in the UK, India, the US and Australia and their websites provide information on educational choices worldwide. Websites owned by IDP Connect include Hotcourses, Postgraduate Search, Whatuni, The Complete University Guide, Hotcourses Abroad, as well as 11 other sites across the globe. They're all free for potential students to use.

Universities, colleges and other course providers advertise on these websites as well as working in partnership with IDP Connect to learn more about their students and generate enrolments. IDP Connect also supported a charity, the Hotcourses Foundation, set up in 2004, which worked with Nyumbani UK to help children in Kenya have access to education.

In 2013 changes to Hotcourses' articles of association were filed at Companies House three years late.

In January 2017, The Hotcourses Group was bought by IDP Education.

References

University and college rankings
Companies based in the London Borough of Hammersmith and Fulham